Universidad Isabel I (Full name in ) (ui1), also known as University Isabel I of Castile or University Isabel I, is a private, state-recognized university located in Burgos, Spain which offers business, law, humanities and health science degrees mainly for working professionals and trainees via blended learning and distance learning. The university was established in 2008 and fully accredited by the Spanish Government via Act of Parliament in 2011 to confer official degrees.

History

The university was founded in 2008 with the aim of providing talented and working people with a challenging academic education, while at the same time enabling them to continue their professional career while studying. Students should be given the opportunity to simultaneously integrate theoretical knowledge from their studies into their everyday professional life and to make use of practical experience from their professional life to better understand complex theoretical study contents. University Isabella I was inaugurated through Act 3/2011 by the Parliament and the President of Castile and León in 2011, when it was also formally authorized by the Kingdom of Spain to enrol official degree courses on Bachelor, Master and PhD level.

In 2021, Forbes listed the university as one of the 20 best universities in Spain.

Campuses

The university's campuses are located in Burgos and Valladolid. In Burgos, in the building of the former Seminario Mayor, in the upper part of the city, some 500 metres from the Cathedral. It occupies an area of 6,534 m2 distributed over five floors and side buildings. The central services of the rector's office, main hall, administration, general secretary's office, media library/virtual library, teachers' work areas and classrooms, as well as the computer services, are located in Calle Fernán González 76. The Valladolid campus is located in Paseo de Filipinos 3 (next to Plaza de Colón and the train station).

Faculties

 Faculty of Law and Economics
 Faculty of Natural Sciences and Technology 
 Faculty of Health Sciences
 Faculty of Humanities and Social Sciences
 Faculty of Criminology

Degree Programmes

In the academic year 2020/2021 University Isabel I offers twelve different bachelor's degrees, 7 double degree undergraduate programmes and more than fifty Master's and postgraduate degrees with different majors.

References

External links 
 

Educational institutions established in 2008
Buildings and structures in Burgos
Private universities and colleges in Spain
Universities in Castile and León
2008 establishments in Spain